Jean Boiteux (20 June 1933 – 11 April 2010) was a French freestyle swimmer. He competed at the 1952, 1956 and 1960 Olympics and won the 400 m event in 1952, breaking the Olympic record and becoming the first French swimmer to win an Olympic gold medal. During his career he won 15 national titles and set 15 national and 10 European records in the 200 m, 400 m, 1500 m and 4 × 200 m events.

His mother Bienna Pélégry was also an Olympic swimmer. His father attended the 1952 Olympics and jumped in the swimming pool to congratulate his son after he won the 400 m race. In 1973 Boiteux founded the Jean-Boiteux Grand Prix swimming meet in Bordeaux. He died after falling from a tree in his garden on 11 April 2010 at the age of 76.

See also
 List of members of the International Swimming Hall of Fame

References

External links

 

1933 births
2010 deaths
French male freestyle swimmers
Olympic swimmers of France
Olympic gold medalists for France
Olympic gold medalists in swimming
Swimmers at the 1952 Summer Olympics
Swimmers at the 1956 Summer Olympics
Swimmers at the 1960 Summer Olympics
Medalists at the 1952 Summer Olympics
Mediterranean Games gold medalists for France
Mediterranean Games medalists in swimming
Swimmers at the 1951 Mediterranean Games
Swimmers at the 1955 Mediterranean Games
European Aquatics Championships medalists in swimming
Accidental deaths from falls
Accidental deaths in France
World record setters in swimming
Swimmers from Marseille